Zhong Yihao (born 23 March 1996) is a Chinese footballer who currently plays for Henan Songshan Longmen in the Chinese Super League.

Club career
Zhong Yihao started his professional football career in 2015 when he was promoted to China League One side Qingdao Jonoon's first team squad. On 4 April 2015, he made his senior debut in a 0–0 home draw against Nei Mongol Zhongyou, coming on as a substitute for Jorge Claros in the 82nd minute. On 13 June 2015, he scored his first senior goal in a 2–1 away win over Shenzhen. Zhong scored four goals in 21 appearances and won the Youth player of the season in the 2017 China League Two season.

Zhong transferred to Chinese Super League side Guangzhou Evergrande Taobao in February 2018. On 25 April 2018, he made his debut for the club in a 1–0 away win over Yinchuan Helanshan in the 2018 Chinese FA Cup. On 2 May 2018, Zhong played in another FA Cup match against Guizhou Hengfeng where he came on for Zhang Wenzhao in the 72nd minute. On 20 May 2018, he made his Super League debut in a 2–0 away loss to Beijing Renhe, coming on as a substitute for Zhang Wenzhao in the 77th minute. On 18 July 2018, he was sent off in the stoppage time for unsporting behaviour in his second Super League appearance against Guizhou Hengfeng. He would go on to establish himself as a regular within the team and go on to win the 2019 Chinese Super League title with the club.

Career statistics
.

Honours

Club
Guangzhou Evergrande
Chinese Super League: 2019

References

External links
 

1996 births
Living people
Chinese footballers
Footballers from Qingdao
Qingdao Hainiu F.C. (1990) players
Guangzhou F.C. players
Chinese Super League players
China League One players
China League Two players
Association football midfielders